Herbert Harper may refer to:
 Herbert Harper (cricketer), English cricketer
 Herbert Reah Harper, British-born Australian electrical engineer
 Herbie Harper, American jazz trombonist